De sotarna! De sotarna! (lit. The Chimney Sweepers! The Chimney Sweepers!) is a 1990 novel by Swedish author Lars Ahlin. It won the August Prize in 1990.

References

1990 Swedish novels
Swedish-language novels
August Prize-winning works
Fictional chimney sweepers
Albert Bonniers Förlag books